Arnica angustifolia is an Arctic and alpine species of plants in the sunflower family, known by the common names narrowleaf arnica and Arctic arnica. It is native to colder regions in Europe, Asia, and North America (northern and western Canada, Alaska, northern Rocky Mountains.

 Subspecies
 Arnica angustifolia subsp. alpina (L.) I.K.Ferguson - Norway, Sweden
 Arnica angustifolia subsp. angustifolia - Eurasia, North America
 Arnica angustifolia subsp. attenuata (Greene) G.W.Douglas & Ruyle-Dougl. - Alaska, Yukon, Northwest Territories, Nunavut, Ungava
 Arnica angustifolia subsp. iljinii (Maguire) I.K.Ferguson - Russia
 Arnica angustifolia subsp. lonchophylla (Greene) G.W.Douglas & Ruyle-Dougl. - British Columbia
 Arnica angustifolia subsp. sornborgeri (Fernald) - Quebec, Labrador, Newfoundland
 Arnica angustifolia subsp. tomentosa (J.M.Macoun) G.W.Douglas & Ruyle-Dougl. - Canadian Rockies, Montana, Quebec, Newfoundland

References

External links
 Naturegate, alpine arnica, Arnica angustifolia
 Alaska Wildflowers
 
 Den Virtuella floran, Fjällarnika, Arnica angustifolia Vahl in Swedish with photos
 Czech Botany, Arnica angustifolia in Czech with photos
 Alpine arnica (Arnica angustifolia) along railroad-tracks photo

angustifolia
Flora of Europe
Flora of Asia
Taxa named by Martin Vahl
Flora of Subarctic America
Flora of Western Canada
Flora of Eastern Canada
Flora of Montana
Flora without expected TNC conservation status